Leon Belasco (born Leonid Simeonovich Berladsky; 11 October 1902  – 1 June 1988) was a Russian-American actor and musician who had a 60-year career in film and television from the 1920s to the 1980s, appearing in more than 100 films.

Musical career
Born in Odessa, Russian Empire, Belasco attended St. Joseph College in Yokohama, Japan, and trained as a musician in Japan and Manchuria. He was briefly the concertmaster of the Japanese-Russian Symphony Orchestra, a predecessor of the NHK Symphony Orchestra.

When he moved on his own to California in 1921 (leaving his parents and brother behind in Harbin, Manchuria), Belasco found occasional work in Hollywood. He made his film debut in 1926 in the silent film The Best People. To supplement his income, he played the violin. Later he formed his own band, which mainly performed in hotels in and around New York City. The Andrews Sisters were introduced through his band.

In 1933, Belasco and his orchestra were heard on the Oldsmobile Program on CBS radio.

Film career

During a season break from a hotel engagement, he returned to Hollywood, first appearing in Broadway Serenade and Topper Takes a Trip (1938). He acted in 13 films in 1942, including Holiday Inn, Casablanca, Yankee Doodle Dandy, and Road to Morocco.

He appeared with the Marx Brothers in their last film together, Love Happy (1949). Being able to speak Russian, he was a dialogue director in Norman Jewison's 1966 comedy The Russians Are Coming, the Russians Are Coming.

Belasco often played eccentric or befuddled European and ethnic characters. He also played heavier roles in espionage dramas. On radio, he played a thieving informant in The Man Called X. His best-known television role was as Appopoplous the landlord in My Sister Eileen (1960). His last film was Superdad (1973), and his final television movie was Woman of the Year (1976).

Television career
Beginning in 1953, Belasco appeared in a variety of television shows, including Maverick (1961), Twilight Zone (1963), My Favorite Martian,(1965) The Lucy Show (1963), The Beverly Hillbillies (1964-1967), My Three Sons (1966), The Dick Van Dyke Show (1966), The Man from U.N.C.L.E. (1966), Little House on the Prairie (1978) and Trapper John, M.D. (1980).

On his death in 1988 in Orange, California, Belasco was cremated, and his ashes scattered.

Selected filmography

 The Saint in New York (1938) - Driver (uncredited)
 Dramatic School (1938) - Nightclub Announcer (uncredited)
 Topper Takes a Trip (1938) - Bellboy
 Fisherman's Wharf (1939) - Luigi
 Beauty for the Asking (1939) - Beauty Shop Owner (uncredited)
 Broadway Serenade (1939) - 'Squeaker'
 The Flying Irishman (1939) - Russian Commentator (uncredited)
 Good Girls Go to Paris (1939) - Nightclub Violinist (uncredited)
 Man About Town (1939) - Arab Petitioner in Show (uncredited)
 Lady of the Tropics (1939) - Assistant to Manager (uncredited)
 On Your Toes (1939) - Mishka - Slave in Ballet (uncredited)
 Legion of Lost Flyers (1939) - 'Frenchy' Rogian
 I Take This Woman (1940) - Pancho (uncredited)
 It's a Date (1940) - Captain of Waiters (uncredited)
 My Favorite Wife (1940) - Waiter - Pacific Club Poolside (uncredited)
 The Lady in Question (1940) - Barber (uncredited)
 Lucky Partners (1940) - Nick #1
 The Mummy's Hand (1940) - Ali
 Spring Parade (1940) - Violinist Orchestra Leader
 Melody and Moonlight (1940) - Maestro (uncredited)
 Tugboat Annie Sails Again (1940) - Headwaiter (uncredited)
 Comrade X (1940) - Comrade Baronoff - Hotel Manager (uncredited)
 Where Did You Get That Girl? (1941) - Hayden
 Tall, Dark and Handsome (1941) - Alfredo Herrera
 Abdul the Bulbul-Ameer (1941, Short) - (voice, uncredited)
 A Girl, a Guy, and a Gob (1941) - First Taxi Driver (uncredited)
 They Dare Not Love (1941) - Pierre (uncredited)
 I'll Wait for You (1941) - Mr. Lapagos, the Tailor
 Kisses for Breakfast (1941) - Piano Accompanist (uncredited)
 Ringside Maisie (1941) - Shady Lawn Band Leader (uncredited)
 Hold Back the Dawn (1941) - Mr. Spitzer (uncredited)
 It Started with Eve (1941) - Couturier (uncredited)
 Never Give a Sucker an Even Break (1941) - Pianist (uncredited)
 Nothing but the Truth (1941) - Dr. Zarak
 Niagara Falls (1941) - Head Waiter
 The Chocolate Soldier (1941) - Waiter at the Double Eagle (uncredited)
 Skylark (1941) - Long-Haired Man in Subway Car
 The Night of January 16th (1941) - Airplane Steward (uncredited)
 Design for Scandal (1941) - Alexander Raoul
 Playmates (1941) - Prince Maharoohu (uncredited)
 Roxie Hart (1942) - Waiter (uncredited)
 The Night Before the Divorce (1942) - Leo - the Headwaiter
 Always in My Heart (1942) - Luke (uncredited)
 Kid Glove Killer (1942) - Chris Spyro - Cook (uncredited)
 Yankee Doodle Dandy (1942) - Magician (uncredited)
 Night in New Orleans (1942) - Waiter in Tavern (uncredited)
 Holiday Inn (1942) - Flower Shop Proprietor (uncredited)
 Give Out, Sisters (1942) - Waiter
 Henry Aldrich, Editor (1942) - Leon Brink
 Between Us Girls (1942) - Nightclub Patron (uncredited)
 Highways by Night (1942) - Howard (uncredited)
 Road to Morocco (1942) - Yusef (uncredited)
 That Other Woman (1942) - Walter
 Casablanca (1942) - Dealer in Rick's Café (uncredited)
 Over My Dead Body (1942) - Pierre
 It Comes Up Love (1943) - Orchestra Leader
 Hers to Hold (1943) - Orchestra Leader (uncredited)
 The Heat's On (1943) - Shore - the Agent (uncredited)
 She's for Me (1943) - Acton
 The Gang's All Here (1943) - Waiter (uncredited)
 Chip Off the Old Block (1944) - Pianist (uncredited)
 And the Angels Sing (1944) - Waiter (uncredited)
 Pin Up Girl (1944) - Mario (uncredited)
 Meet the People (1944) - Milo (uncredited)
 San Diego, I Love You (1944) - Violinist (uncredited)
 The Conspirators (1944) - Vincent's Waiter (uncredited)
 An American Romance (1944) - Cigar Store Proprietor (uncredited)
 Storm Over Lisbon (1944) - Fado Singer (uncredited)
 Night Club Girl (1945) - Gaston
 See My Lawyer (1945) - Violinist (uncredited)
 Earl Carroll Vanities (1945) - Baron Dashek
 Hollywood and Vine (1945) - Cedric Borris
 Wonder Man (1945) - Pianist (uncredited)
 Easy to Look At (1945) - Phillipe
 Out of This World (1945) - Leon (uncredited)
 Yolanda and the Thief (1945) - Taxi Driver
 Swing Parade of 1946 (1946) - Pete
 Suspense (1946) - Pierre Yasha
 Holiday in Mexico (1946) - Orchestra Leader (uncredited)
 Little Iodine (1946) - Simkins
 It Happened on Fifth Avenue (1947) - Musician (uncredited)
 Philo Vance Returns (1947) - Alexis Karnoff
 Three Daring Daughters (1948) - Ship Bandleader (uncredited)
 I, Jane Doe (1948) - Duroc
 For the Love of Mary (1948) - Igor
 Adventures of Don Juan (1948) - Don de Cordoba (uncredited)
 Every Girl Should Be Married (1948) - Violinist
 Jiggs and Maggie in Jackpot Jitters (1949) - Gambler (uncredited)
 Holiday in Havana (1949) - Luis Amantado (uncredited)
 Love Happy (1949) - Mr. Lyons
 Everybody Does It (1949) - Prof. Hugo
 Bagdad (1949) - Beggar
 Nancy Goes to Rio (1950) - Prof. Gama (uncredited)
 Ma and Pa Kettle Go to Town (1950) - Beauty Salon Manager (uncredited)
 Please Believe Me (1950) - The Croupier
 Love That Brute (1950) - François Ducray aka Frenchy
 The Flame and the Arrow (1950) - Arturo of Milan / Players' Impresario / Court Announcer (uncredited)
 Abbott and Costello in the Foreign Legion (1950) - Hassam—Auctioneer
 The Toast of New Orleans (1950) - Dominiques' Orchestra Leader (uncredited)
 Bomba and the Hidden City (1950) - Raschid
 Cuban Fireball (1951) - Hunyabi
 Little Egypt (1951) - Moulai
 Havana Rose (1951) - Renaldi
 The Golden Horde (1951) - Nazza the Astrologer (uncredited)
 The Fabulous Senorita (1952) - Señor Gonzales
 Gobs and Gals (1952) - Peter
 Son of Ali Baba (1952) - Babu
 Jalopy (1953) - Prof. Bosgood Elrod
 Call Me Madam (1953) - Leader (uncredited)
 Geraldine (1953) - Professor Dubois
 Can-Can (1960) - Arturo - orchestra leader
 My Six Loves (1963) - Mario
 The Art of Love (1965) - Prince
 Superdad (1973) - Limousine Driver
 Won Ton Ton: The Dog Who Saved Hollywood (1976) - Fromberg Butler With Phone Call (uncredited)

References

External links

 
 

1902 births
1988 deaths
Musicians from Odesa
Emigrants from the Russian Empire to the United States
American male film actors
American male stage actors
American male radio actors
20th-century American male actors
20th-century American violinists
American male violinists
20th-century American male musicians
Musicians from Yokohama